Shirley Kwan or Kwan Suk Yee (born 15 August 1966) is an influential Cantopop singer from Hong Kong. Kwan first shot to fame in 1989 with the hit, "Happy Are Those in Love" and was widely popular throughout the early to mid-1990s. She is noted for her distinct, whispery vocal style and known equally for singing mainstream ballads and more alternative songs.

Early life
Kwan was born in Hong Kong and moved to Los Angeles at the age of twelve. She studied fashion before venturing into the entertainment industry in 1986, at the age of 20.

Music career

1986–1988: Early years

Kwan had her first taste of the limelight in 1986 when she became one of twelve finalists in TVB's New Talent Singing Awards, along with Andy Hui and Leon Lai, but lost to both. Two years later, with the encouragement of a friend, she recorded a demo tape for the prestigious "Marine Blue" singing competition in Japan and won. She caught the eyes of record executives at Apollon and signed a contract, releasing two Japanese pop albums in two years. Kwan sang in both Japanese and English for these releases, and notably made her first and only rap vocals in the song "Borderless".

1989–1995: PolyGram period

Kwan's Marine Blue success in Japan quickly led to her discovery by PolyGram. On 1 March 1989, Kwan released her debut Cantonese album "Winter Love", with its R&B-influenced first single, "The Rebel".

Her second album, "Happy Are those in Love", would produce her first major hit with its title track, which immediately propelled Kwan into Hong Kong stardom. The song "Happy are Those in Love" was the theme song to a popular day-time drama series on TVB. It reached no. 1 on the TVB charts and was frequently requested in karaoke bars at the time. The album, which sold platinum, enjoyed huge chart success and spawned a further hit single, the up-tempo "Lovers Underneath the Stars", with Kwan sweeping newcomer awards at all of the major year-end music award shows.

The following two years saw the release of four albums, in which Kwan started to develop a more individualistic style. After scoring another major pop hit in 1990 with 愛恨纏綿, Kwan began incorporating elements from a wider variety of musical genres. Her 1991 album Love is Forever saw her exploring New Age music, with cover versions of songs by Gregorian and Michael Cretu. As a marketing strategy, PolyGram presented its title track, which was a cover version of "Once in a Life Time," back to back with the Gregorian original on the promotional disc that was sent out to radio DJs at the time. Kwan also covered Amina's 1991 winning Eurovision entry, "Le dernier qui a parlé", rewritten by veteran lyricist Andrew Lam as "Buddhist Chant", which became a surprising top 10 radio single.

On 18 November 1993, Kwan released the platinum-selling album, "The Story of Shirley", which spawned the minor hit "Fake Love". The album signalled a change in vocal style, with a whispery delivery that featured more prominently than before, and which would become her trademark style.

Kwan further established her place as a cantopop diva with the album, "My Way", released on 8 July 1994. This would be the last album containing all original Cantonese material until Shirley's Era in 2009. Singles included the acid-jazz influenced "Death of a Legend" which sampled a riff from the Digable Planets' 1993 single "Rebirth of Slick," and the immensely popular ballad "Cuddling Underneath the Stars", another of Kwan's major career hits, which won numerous song awards at the ceremonies that year. The album also featured two of Andrew Lam's techno and house inflected compositions "Anxiety" and "Out of This World", as well as another popular ballad "Farewell Love Song". My Way, the cover of which featured Kwan in a new crew-cut look that has since become iconic, was one of the most celebrated in 1994, enjoying a high-degree of both commercial and critical success.

With increasing confidence in her musical style, Kwan asked producer Joseph Ip and eight different sound engineers to rearrange ten of her favourite cantopop songs which she handpicked for a covers album. The result was "'EX' All Time Favourites," released in February 1995, which featured covers of classics by Anita Mui, Leslie Cheung and Alan Tam, reworked and reinterpreted with Kwan's alternative musical influences and trademark, ethereal singing style. The lead single, a cover version of Teresa Teng's "Forget Him" rearranged by Donald Ashley, was featured in Wong Kar-wai's 1995 arthouse film Fallen Angels. The album sold three times platinum, and was selected in 2000 as one of the Top 20 Defining Chinese Albums of All Time for the book (聽見2000分之100) by a jury of musicians which included Anthony Wong, Sandee Chan, Carl Wong and Lin Wei-Che.

In the summer of 1995, Kwan released her third compilation album, "Journey of Life" (世途上　新曲＋精選), containing two new singles, "He Needs You, She Needs You", a dreampop track which incorporated the traditional Chinese instrument erhu, and the minor hit, "Are There Real Friends in Life", a pop ballad which has since become a fan favourite.

Riding on the success of a string of platinum-selling albums, Kwan held her first large-scale solo concert series, "The One and Only Shirley Kwan in Concert", in June 1995 at the Hong Kong Coliseum.

1996–2000: Hiatus
After seven years at PolyGram, Kwan's contract came to an end in June 1996. A final PolyGram studio album was initially scheduled for release in the summer, containing three American collaborations ("Infectious" [傳染] and "Elusive Love" [愛難尋] written by Andy Goldmark; and "Mumbling" [自言自語] by Suzanne Fountain) and seven other tracks. However, due to Kwan's departure, PolyGram released the material separately in 1997's compilation "Connection" and 1998's EP "eZone".

Kwan spent the second half of the 90s mostly away from the public eye, but managed to strike up some significant collaborations with friends and fellow contemporaries Tats Lau and Anthony Wong Yiu Ming of the former Tat Ming Pair. The first of these included "Blessed Mary", a duet with Wong satirising Hong Kong's materialism released in late 1995. This was followed by the Tats Lau collaboration "Cuddle 28800BPS" (繾綣28800BPS), a song dealing with cyber love, and a cover version of the gender-ambiguous Tat Ming classic "Forget He is She" at their request, both in 1996. In 1997, Kwan lent her vocals to the theme song of a radio drama produced by Commercial Radio Hong Kong, "Take Me Out Dancing" which featured a soprano backing vocal mixed with a thumping dance beat. In 1999, she held a "Music Is Live" concert organized by Commercial Radio.

2001–2002: BMG period
After several years of inactivity, Kwan attempted a short comeback in 2001, signing a contract reportedly worth 8-million dollars with BMG Taiwan in a high-profile press conference. Working with well-known producers such as Anthony Bao, Jamie Hsueh, and Benjamin Lin, she released one Mandarin album, Freezing Flame in November, to critical acclaim. The album spawned two singles, "Freezing Flame" and "Who" which featured a mix of string instruments and electronic elements. Although the initial contract was for 4 albums, this came to a halt in 2002, when Kwan had become pregnant and moved to Canada. It was in an interview with Mingpao in 2013, in which she revealed that BMG had not arranged for any recording sessions for more than a year after she gave birth, and this ultimately led to an early termination.

In 2003, she was requested by Eason Chan to record guest vocals for the track "Lies" on his album Live for Today.

2005–2006: Music Nation period

In fall 2005, Kwan stepped into the recording studio once again and duet with music veteran Alan Tam in "Rekindle The Flame", a Cantonese remake of the French ballad "J'ai murmuré va-t-en". The news of Kwan making a comeback sent excitement through Hong Kong's airwaves, and "Rekindle" took the charts by storm, reaching number 1 on TVB, RTHK and Metro Radio.

Two months later, Kwan was signed to a contract with Music Nation Group by the famous producer, Frankie Lee Chun. The first single "About Me" saw Kwan reunited with lyrist Wyman Wong and long-time collaborators Joseph Ip and John Laudon. Supported by extensive airplay, "About Me" steadily climbed to the top of various radio charts, and its limited-release special edition CD sold out within a day.

In early February 2006, the eponymous EP "Shirley Kwan" was released, introducing the second brand new single, "Evolution". This coincided with the release of a 3CD-Karaoke plus DVD compilation by Universal Music (formally PolyGram), entitled "All About Shirley," which contained side projects and rare tracks dating back to the very beginning of her career in Japan.

To much anticipation, three comeback concerts, "Being Shirley On Stage" were held in late February, at the legendary Hong Kong Coliseum. Performing her biggest hits in reverse chronological order, Kwan garnered positive reviews for the performance, which dominated entertainment headlines for a week. In the final encore, Kwan famously covered Eason Chan's "Today Next Year" to a standing ovation, and a sing-a-long audience of 30, 000.

2007–2009: Star Entertainment period

Upon completion of her contract with Music Nation, Kwan released two new songs in February 2007 as an independent artist for songwriter Keith Chan's multimedia musical "12 faces of woman" at the 2007 Hong Kong Arts Festival. This included the theme song "All Living Flowers", which featured a mix of traditional Chinese and Western string instruments and a duet with Lee Heung Kam, "3000 Years Ago" which won the CASH Golden Sail Music Award for Best Alternative Song. In March, she released the single "Just Once", which was the theme song to a primetime TVB sitcom series and reached no. 1 on the TVB singles chart.

In June 2007, longtime friend and veteran producer Herman Ho recruited Shirley to his new company "Star Entertainment Ltd.", which is financed by Neway Karaoke Box (Neway卡拉OK).

On 15 June 2009, Kwan released the long-anticipated studio album, Shirley's Era, which contains all singles released in 2007–2008 as well as newly recorded material. This marked her first, full-length Cantonese studio album since 1994's All Time Favourites. The album produced the new single, "The Ends of the Earth" which reached no. 1 on the 903 Commercial Radio charts.

2010–2017: Independent
In October 2010, Kwan performed a live concert "One Starry Night: An Evening with Shirley Kwan" at the Venetian Arena in Macau, which featured mostly live covers of songs by other artists, such as Alan Tam's "Illusion", Aaron Kwok's "Why did I let you go?" and Faye Wong's "I'm Willing". She returned to the same stage on 12 November 2011 with long-time friend and collaborator Anthony Wong for the concert, "Anthony Wong x Shirley Kwan: Forget He is She Concert, Macau 2011."

In 2012, Kwan collaborated with Juno Mak on the single "Clavicle", which offers a mature example of her dream pop vocals and reached no. 1 on the Commercial Radio charts. In late 2012, she released the limited edition single, "Tourbillon", a cover of an Eason Chan song to polarized reviews, but which was lauded by both the lyricist Wyman Wong and Anthony Wong for her authorial style.

On 2 February 2013, she held her 4th concert series at the Hong Kong Coliseum, "Philip Stein Your Favorite Shirley Kwan Suk'E In Concert," for two consecutive evenings. Later that year, she took part in a series of concerts, "Polygram Forever" for the newly revived label and recorded the theme song, "Coincidence" for the TVB series Always and Ever.

In 2014, she recorded a duet with Mag Lam as the theme song to the TVB series Never Dance Alone.

In 2016, Kwan held a concert celebrating her 25th anniversary in the music industry, "The Best of Shirley Kwan 25 Live," at the Hong Kong Coliseum to rave reviews. Kwan dedicated the performance to her late mother, and broke down during her performance of the Hins Cheung cover, "Stay Young Forever", prompting a memorable audience sing-along.

On 9 April 2017, she performed as a musical guest at the 36th Hong Kong Film awards amidst controversy of her recent arrest for intimidation and common assault. She performed a medley of theme songs including "Invincible" and "Let Me Stay by Your Side" backed by Hanjin Tan, Supper Moment and The Interzone Collective, as well as presented the awards for Best Original Film Song and Best Original Score.

2018–2020: Universal period and retirement 
In 2018, Kwan signed on with Universal Music Group. However, the working relationship between the company and Kwan was rocky, and Kwan announced that she would retire from the entertainment industry after having fulfilled her contract.

Discography

Studio albums
1989: Winter Love
1989: Happy are Those in Love
1989: Say Goodbye [Japanese]
1990: True Love
1990: Borderless [Japanese / English]
1990: Lost in the Night
1991: Golden Summer
1991: Love is Forever
1992: Creating an Illusion
1993: The Story of Shirley
1994: Happy are Those in Love [Mandarin]
1994: My Way
1995: Ex' All Time Favourites
1995: Bewildered [Mandarin]
2001: Freezing Flame [Mandarin]
2009: Shirley's Era
2019: Psychoacoustics
2020: eZONE

EPs
1998: eZone
2006: Shirley Kwan

Compilations
1991: Montage
1993: Montage II
1995: Journey of Life (世途上 新曲+精選)  
1997: Telepathic Connection (心靈相通 新曲+精選)
2008: Unlimited

Filmography
In early 1997, Kwan was asked by Hong Kong filmmaker Wong Kar-wai to star in his film Happy Together. She was flown to Argentina in five days' notice and ended up spending more than two months filming. Starring opposite Tony Leung Chiu-Wai and Chang Chen, Kwan played Leung's mysterious and lonely secret admirer and also recorded a cover of Caetano Veloso's "Cucurucucu Paloma" (Song of Dove) for the film's soundtrack. However, her scenes were all deleted from the final version of the film, for which Wong later went on to win Best Director at the Cannes. It took another three years for Kwan's scenes to surface, when they were included in the making-of documentary, Buenos Aires Zero Degrees. The documentary premiered at the 2000 Berlin International Film Festival out of competition, and was also shown at the 2000 Golden Horse Film Festival and Awards in Taiwan.

Personal life
Kwan is a single mother and gave birth to her son in January 2002 in Canada. For a long time, Kwan has not disclosed the true paternity of her child and insisted only that they had met in Canada, and is not someone in the entertainment business. Kwan broke her silence on the matter in 2014 when she posted a photo of Zuri Rinpoche the 8th, a Bhutanese religious teacher, on her Instagram, with a caption saying he is the true father of her child.

In the past, Kwan has been romantically linked to Michael Chow (1992–96), and Hacken Lee.

Controversies
In September 2012, Kwan posted a suicidal message on Facebook. She was incommunicado for roughly thirty-six hours before contacting her younger sister to confirm her safety.

In October 2016, Kwan was rescued from the waters off Kensington Beach. She was walking along the shore with a female friend, who had reportedly told officers that she was unhappy from work and had walked down to the sea for a swim.

In May 2017, Kwan was charged with one count of intimidation and one count of common assault for an altercation that took place with a Kensington Beach Hotel restaurant staff earlier in March.

Concerts

Awards
1988
Marine Blue Singing Competition, Japan
1989
RTHK 12th Top 10 Gold Song Awards – Best Newcomer (Silver) 
CASH Golden Sail Music Awards – Best Chinese (Pop) Song: "Happy are Those in Love"
Jade Solid Gold 2nd Seasonal Awards – "Happy are Those in Love"
Jade Solid Gold 4th Seasonal Awards – "Lovers Underneath the Stars"
Jade Solid Gold Best 10 Awards Presentation – Song Award: "Happy are Those in Love"
Jade Solid Gold Best 10 Awards Presentation –  Most Popular Newcomer 
Commercial Radio Hong Kong Ultimate Song Chart Awards – Best Female Newcomer (Gold)
1990
Jade Solid Gold 2nd Seasonal Awards –
Jade Solid Gold Best 10 Awards Presentation – Song Award:
1991
Jade Solid Gold 1st Seasonal Awards – "Lost in the Night"
Jade Solid Gold 3rd Seasonal Awards –
1992
Jade Solid Gold 1st Seasonal Awards – "Love is Forever"
CRHK Ultimate Song Chart Awards – Ultimate Female Singer (Bronze)
Metro Radio Hit Music Awards – Breakthrough Female Singer 
Metro Radio Hit Music Awards – Hit Female Singer (Bronze)
1993
Jade Solid Gold 3rd Seasonal Awards – "Summer Party" (熱力節拍 Wou Bom Ba) 
Jade Solid Gold 4th Seasonal Awards – "Fake Love"
Jade Solid Gold Best 10 Awards Presentation – Best Music Video: "Summer Party"  (熱力節拍 Wou Bom Ba)
1994
1st Annual Hong Kong Record Design Awards – Best Hairstyle: My Way
RTHK 17th Top 10 Gold Song Awards – Song Award: "Cuddling Under the Stars"
Metro Radio Hit Music Awards – Song Award: "Cuddling Under the Stars"
Jade Solid Gold 3rd Seasonal Awards – "Cuddling Under the Stars"
Jade Solid Gold Best 10 Awards Presentation – Song Award: "Cuddling Under the Stars"
1995
Jade Solid Gold 1st Seasonal Awards – "Forget Him"
Jade Solid Gold 3rd Seasonal Awards – "Are There Soulmates in Life?"
CRHK Ultimate Song Chart Awards – Ultimate Female Singer (Silver)
Metro Radio Hit Music Awards – Best Adult Contemporary Ballad: "Are There Soulmates in Life?"
1996
Metro Radio Hit Music Awards – Female Singer Award (Silver)
Metro Radio Hit Music Awards – Song Award: "Forget Him"
2007
CASH Golden Sail Music Awards – Best Alternative Song: "3000 Years Ago"
2008
8th Chinese Media Music Awards – Special Jury Prize: "3000 Years Ago"
2013
Jade Solid Gold Selections (Part One)  – "Tourbillon"

References

External links
 Shirley Kwan on Hong Kong Movie Database
 'e space – the first web site dedicated to Shirley

Hong Kong Buddhists
20th-century Hong Kong women singers
20th-century Hong Kong actresses
21st-century Hong Kong women singers
Cantopop singers
Hong Kong Mandopop singers
New Talent Singing Awards contestants
1966 births
Cantonese people
Living people
Hong Kong film actresses